Finland–Germany relations are the bilateral relations between the Finland and Germany. Both countries are part of the European Union and are signatories of the Schengen Agreement.
Germany has given full support to Finland's membership of the European Union. Germany supports Finland's NATO membership.

History

 
Relations between both nations began after the German Empire recognised the newly independent Finnish state on January 4, 1918. In the ensuing Finnish Civil War, Germany played a prominent role siding with the White Army and training Finnish Jägers. In one of the decisive battles of the war, German troops took Helsinki in April 1918.

During World War II, the secret protocol in Molotov-Ribbentrop pact enabled the Winter War (1939–40), a Soviet attack on Finland. Finland and Nazi Germany were "co-belligerents" against Soviet Union during the Continuation War (1941–44), but a separate peace with Soviet Union led to the Finnish-German Lapland War (1944–45).

Finland recognised both the Federal Republic of Germany and the German Democratic Republic (West and East Germany) in 1972 and it established diplomatic relations with East Germany in July 1972 and with West Germany in January 1973.

Resident diplomatic missions
 Finland has an embassy in Berlin.
 Germany has an embassy in Helsinki.

Finland also has a consulate general in Hamburg, two honorary consulates general in Düsseldorf and Munich and other honorary consulates in Bremen, Dresden, Frankfurt am Main, Hanover, Kiel, Lübeck, Rostock, Stuttgart and Wilhelmshaven.

See also 
 Foreign relations of Finland 
 Foreign relations of Germany
 Germans in Finland
 Kingdom of Finland (1918)
 Germany–Sweden relations
 Accession of Finland to the European Union

References

Further reading
 Cohen, William B., and Jörgen Svensson. "Finland and the Holocaust." Holocaust and Genocide Studies 9.1 (1995): 70-93.

 Hentilä, Seppo. "Maintaining neutrality between the two German states: Finland and divided Germany until 1973." Contemporary European History 15.4 (2006): 473-493.
 Holmila, Antero. "Finland and the Holocaust: A reassessment." Holocaust and Genocide Studies 23.3 (2009): 413-440. online
 Holmila, Antero, and Oula Silvennoinen. "The Holocaust Historiography in Finland." Scandinavian Journal of History 36.5 (2011): 605-619. online
 Lunde, Henrik O. Finland's War of Choice: The Troubled German-Finnish Coalition in World War II (Casemate, 2011).

 Rusi, Alpo. "Finnish-German Relations and the Helsinki-Berlin-Moscow Geopolitical Triangle." in The Germans and Their Neighbors (Routledge, 2019) pp. 179-198.
 Tarkka, Jukka. Neither Stalin nor Hitler : Finland during the Second World War (1991) online 

 Vehviläinen, Olli. Finland in the second world war: between Germany and Russia (Springer, 2002).

External links
 German Ministry for Foreign Affairs of Germany: relations with Finland
 Finnish Ministry for Foreign Affairs: relations with Germany

 
Germany
Bilateral relations of Germany